The Frankfurt (Oder) tramway network is a network of tramways forming part of the public transport system in Frankfurt (Oder), a town in the federal state of Brandenburg, Germany, on the Oder River, at the German-Polish border.

Opened in 1898, the network presently consists of five lines.

Lines 
, the three main tram lines in Frankfurt (Oder) operated daily 4:00 to 23:30, at:
 a 20-minute headway: Monday to Friday, 6:00–19:00, and Saturday 9:00–16:00;
 a 30-minute headway: Sundays and public holidays all day (from 6:00), and Monday-Saturday before and after the period with 20-minute intervals.

Line 1 runs from the new housing development of Neuberesinchen through the city centre to the stadium.

Line 2 connects the university campuses (the main building, the auditorium and the Marion Gräfin Dönhoff building) with the speech centre in the Witzlebenstraße and extends to the fairgrounds.

Line 3 is a booster line for line 4 on weekdays. It operates Monday to Friday from the European University via the Südring to Kopernikusstraße, and, in rush hour, continues to the Technology Park and the hospital in the suburb of Markendorf (Ort) at 20-minute intervals.

Line 4, a main line, runs from the Lebus-suburb in Frankfurt's north via the railway station and the Südring, past the new solar factories, to Markendorf (Ort).

Line 5 is a tangential line - it "bypasses" the city centre, from Neuberesinchen via the station to the fairgrounds. However, it connects at Dresdener Platz or the station with lines towards the city centre. On weekdays, it is operated every 20 minutes by KT4Dms running in pairs, or a single KT4Dm, or a low-floor vehicle.

Rolling stock 
SVF operates GT6M low-floor vehicle and KT4Dms.

See also
 Trams in Germany
 List of town tramway systems in Germany

References

External links

 
 

Frankfurt (Oder)
Frankfurt (Oder)
Transport in Brandenburg
Metre gauge railways in Germany
Frankfurt Oder